2011 the Chilean Ministry of Housing and Urban Planning under the direction of Magdalena Matte signed a judicial settlement that authorized the payment of 17,000 million CLP (Chilean Pesos) (approximately 24,000,000 Euro in 2011) to building contractor "Consorcio de Construcciones Kodama Ltda." for works that were valued in maximal 3,000 million CLP by Institute for Experimentation and Research of Materials, IDIEM of the University of Chile. The payment transaction, that corresponds to 15,000 Chilean social housing properties, was stopped in last minute.

Background

In the course of works for Transantiago the Ministry of Housing and Urban Planning, under the administration of Michelle Bachelet, ordered in November 2006 the construction of a Bus lane in "Avenue Pedro Aguirre Cerda" for $25.500 million CLP that should be finished in 2007. After changes to the project, the project was finished in May 2010, 899 days after schedule.

For the extras as consequence of changes the contractor demanded on 2009 7,000 million CLP from the ministry but the authority valued the additional costs only to 950 million CLP (Resolución 134, on 16. February 2010) and announced this to the Contraloría General de la República de Chile. Eights months later, under the administration of Sebastián Piñera, the Contraloría refused the payment transaction and authorized the payment of (only) 95 million CLP (toma de razón definitiva de Contraloría, new pay, on 6. October 2010).

On 15. December 2010, Kodama Ltda. filed a lawsuit for 41,000 million CLP against the Chilean State  to the 10. Civil Court in Santiago de Chile. That were 493% more than the initially demanded 7,000 million.

For unknown reasons on 25. January 2011 the Decree 8, signed by the Minister for Housing and Urban Planning, authorized the payment of 17,000 million CLP to the contractor Kodama Ltda.. This offer was accepted by the contractor and the settlement was signed in the 10. Civil Court of Santiago.

Kodama
The contractor "Consorcio de Construcciones Kodama Ltda.", property of Kenji Kodama, works since 18 years for the government and blames the ministry and its inefficiency for the delay and the 130 changes done to the project. The contractor substantiates his payment request through an investigation of Ingeniería DICTUC, a filial enterprise of the Universidad Católica de Chile.

Consequences

The case is under investigation by the prosecutor José Morales. On 19 April 2011, stepped down the Minister Magdalena Matte as did on 25 April the director of Serviu (servicio de Vivienda y Urbanismo) Antonio Llompart, the subdirector of legal affairs of the Ministry, Rafael Marambio (who recognized to have accepted a flight ticket to Buenos Aires from Kodam) and subdirector for Pavimentación y Obras Viales, Franz Greve. The asesor of Minister Matte, Alvaro Baeza also stepped down.

References

External links
 El ministerio en llamas by Fernando Paulsen in Spanish language
 Huele a peligro by Fernando Paulsen in Spanish language
 Contraloría General de la República, Investigación especial Nr. 27, de 2011, sobre una transacción celebrada entre el servicio de vivienda y urbanización región metropolitana y el consorcio construcciones kodama Ltda. in Spanish language
 Ximena Pérez Villamil, Cómo se reubicaron las piezas del Caso Kodama in El Mostrador on 23 February 2013

Political scandals in Chile